High Cove is a major slip feature to the west of Grasslees Burn in the Simonside Hills, Northumberland, England. It contains several small rifts and caves in gritstone, up to 18 metres in length. In 1985, the Moldywarps Speleological Group explored four caves at High Cove, then in 2015 a further four were discovered by Black Rose Caving Club.

References

Caves of Northumberland